Plumíferos (Free Birds: Flying Adventures) is a 2010 Argentine computer-animated adventure comedy film, produced by CS Entertainment, Manos Digitales Animation Studio, and 100 Bares Producciones, and was released on February 18, 2010 in Argentina. The film was directed by Daniel DeFelippo and Gustavo Giannini.

The English-language version was released direct-to-video in the United States on 1 April 2014 titled Birds of Paradise from Lionsgate Home Entertainment, featuring the voices of Ashley Tisdale, Drake Bell, Jon Lovitz, Ken Jeong, Jane Lynch, and Keith David.

Plot
"It's an everyday universe that exists 7 feet over our heads. They are city birds that you can find in every tree or every corner."

Development
The project was completed in 2009 and released in theaters in Argentina on February 18, 2010.

Cast
 Luisana Lopilato as Feifi, a canary that escapes from the cage of a network tycoon, Mr. Puertas, and starts trying a new life in freedom as a common bird.
 Mariano Martínez as Juan, a house sparrow that feels ordinary and underestimates his own race. Accidentally, he changes the way he looks, and the same reason that will make him feel unique is what is going to put his life in danger.
 Carla Peterson as Clarita, a bat.
 Mirta Wons as Libia, a rock pigeon. The character is portrayed as a man in the English dub.
 Luis Machín as Sr. Puertas, a network tycoon.
 Peto Menahem as Pipo, a blue-chested hummingbird.

Animation
The film's animation was done by Manos Digitales Animation Studio, using Blender and other open source software for all 3D models, animation, lighting and render process, under Linux operating systems. Since then, Plumíferos is the first feature film to be 100% completely animated in Blender.

See also
 List of animated feature-length films
 List of computer-animated films

References

External links
 advertisement redirect
 
 Video conference with creators (2006, 69 mins)
 Interview with one of the makers  (Google translation)
Manos Digitales

2010 films
2010 computer-animated films
Argentine animated films
2010s adventure comedy films
2010s Spanish-language films
2010 comedy films
2010s Argentine films